Corythangela is a genus of moth, belonging to the family Batrachedridae. It was transferred to this family by Baldizonne in 1996 (It is traditionally grouped in the Coleophoridae).

Species
Corythangela galeata Meyrick, 1897
Corythangela fimbriata Baldizzone, 1996

References

Batrachedridae